Rail transport in Europe is characterized by its diversity, both technical and infrastructural. Electrified railway networks operate at a plethora of different voltages AC and DC varying from 750 to 25,000 volts, and signaling systems vary from country to country, hindering cross-border traffic.

The European Union aims to make cross-border operations easier as well as to introduce competition to national rail networks. EU member states were able to separate the provision of transport services and the management of the infrastructure by the Single European Railway Directive 2012. Usually, national railway companies were split to separate divisions or independent companies for infrastructure, passenger and freight operations. The passenger operations may be further divided to long-distance and regional services, because regional services often operate under public service obligations (which maintain services which are not economically interesting to private companies but nonetheless produce societal benefit), while long-distance services usually operate without subsidies.

Freight

Overview
Overall Only about 18% of European cargo moves via railways; in some countries, such as France, the percentage is much lower, but it is obviously higher in other countries, including Lithuania where over 70% of domestic cargo is transported by train.  The relative weakness of rail freight is due to the lower price of truck transport which externalizes a larger share of costs than rail.  By way of comparison, in the U.S., 40% of cargo (by ton-kilometer) moves via rail. Similarly Swiss railroads carry about 40% (by ton kilometers) of Swiss domestic freight and even more than 70% of the (mostly international) Alp-crossing cargo traffic - 74.4% in the first half of 2021. The New railway link through the Alps which includes the Gotthard Base tunnel, one of the longest tunnels in the world was built specifically to shift Alp-crossing freight traffic from road to rail.

Impediments to trans-European freight trains
A big problem for long running international freight services - despite the European Single Market allowing for freedom of movement of goods, capital, labor and people and the Schengen area drastically reducing internal border controls - are the various differing standards for electrification, loading gauge, signaling and even gauge - Finland (Russian gauge), Portugal and Spain (Iberian gauge) use their own broad gauges as do the Baltic States and several non-EU members (mostly Russian gauge). Rail Baltica is an EU-funded project to provide a standard gauge rail link in and through the Baltic countries, potentially connecting to a Helsinki-Tallinn tunnel. While attempts to unify the divergent standards date back to at least the 1880s with the Conférence internationale pour l’unité technique des chemins de fer (international conference for the technical unity of railroads) in Berne, Switzerland, setting minimum standards for loading gauges (so called Berne gauge) and the so called "Berne space" (the space reserved for railroad workers in buffer and chain couplers), most standards still differ widely between and even within countries as many rules only apply to newly built infrastructure but much of Europe's railroad infrastructure was built in the 19th century.

Couplers and automation
Another problem is that while Aviation English is a de facto global standard with few non-English holdouts, railroading is virtually always done in the local language, requiring train operators either to be polyglots or necessitating a change of staff at every (language) border. Another big impediment to freight rail in Europe is the coupling system commonly used. While the Scharfenberg coupler, a mostly automatic system, is now commonly used on passenger trains, its relatively low limit on maximum tonnage it can pull makes it unsuitable for most freight operations. While the American freight railroads largely use Janney couplers, the European freight railroads are largely stuck with the antiquated buffer and chain coupler which requires railway workers to screw each connection open and shut again during shunting reducing speed and efficiency and increasing labor cost. There are plans to replace the outdated system with a new digital automatic coupling system, but those have taken longer than expected and are still far from completion. A pilot project regarding the digital automatic coupling system was launched by the German Federal Ministry of Transportation in 2020 and is to last until 2022.

Train lengths and double stacking
Train lengths in Europe are limited by the size of passing loops and refuge sidings as well as the placement of signals. There are plans to allow trains of lengths up to 740–750 meters to use the main freight lines by upgrading the requisite infrastructure. And various construction projects to that end have already been completed. Still, 750 meters is still much shorter than the longest trains and many freight railroads throughout the world routinely run significantly longer trains. Double stack rail transport where two intermodal containers are stacked atop another either on flatcars or specifically designed well cars is virtually unheard of in Europe as the loading gauge of most lines doesn't allow for it. While the Betuweroute in the Netherlands was built with height clearances allowing double stacking, it does not (as of 2021) connect to any rail line that allows double stacking and no double stack container trains have ever run along it.

Differences between countries 

The 2017 European Railway Performance Index ranked the performance of national rail systems as follows:
Tier One: Switzerland, Denmark, Finland, Germany, Austria, Sweden, and France.
Tier Two: Great Britain, the Netherlands, Luxembourg, Spain, the Czech Republic, Norway, Belgium, and Italy.
Tier Three: Lithuania, Slovenia, Ireland, Hungary, Latvia, Slovakia, Poland, Portugal, Romania, and Bulgaria.

Rail gauge

While most railways in Europe use —in some other countries, like on the Iberian Peninsula, or countries which territories used to be a part of Russian Empire and Soviet Union: widespread broad gauge exists. In Spain and Portugal  (also known as Iberian gauge) is used. Ireland uses the somewhat unusual  gauge, referred to in Ireland as "Irish Gauge" (but is an island with no external cross-border links). If a (railroad) Irish Sea Bridge were ever built, the break of gauge issue between the island of Ireland and Great Britain would turn from a hypothetical question into a concrete problem.

Electrification

Likewise, electrification of lines varies between countries. 15 kV AC has been used in Germany, Austria, Switzerland, Norway and Sweden since 1912, while the Netherlands and France use 1500 V DC. France and Croatia also use 25 kV AC, Belgium, Italy and Slovenia use 3 kV DC. All this makes the construction of truly pan-European vehicles a challenging task and, until recent developments in locomotive construction, was mostly ruled out as being impractical and too expensive.

The development of an integrated European high-speed rail network is overcoming some of these differences. All high-speed lines outside of Russia, including those built in Spain and Portugal, use  tracks. Likewise all European high-speed lines, outside of Germany, Austria and Italy use 25 kV AC electrification (Electrification of high-speed rail in Italy is mixed 3 kV DC and 25 kV AC). This means that by 2020 high-speed trains can travel from Italy to the United Kingdom, or Portugal to the Netherlands without the need for multi-voltage systems or breaks of gauge — or they could, if they didn't have to commute from one high-speed line to the next over "classical" lines using a different voltage and/or frequency.

Train protection 

Multiple incompatible train protection systems are another barrier to interoperability. A unified system, ETCS is the EU's project to unify train protection across Europe. The specification was written in 1996 in response to EU Directive 96/48/EC. ETCS is developed as part of the European Rail Traffic Management System (ERTMS) initiative, and is being tested by multiple Railway companies since 1999. All new high-speed lines and freight main lines funded partially by the EU are required to use ETCS Level 1 or Level 2.

Loading gauge

The loading gauge on the main lines of Great Britain, almost all of which were built before 1900, is generally smaller than in mainland Europe, where the slightly larger Berne gauge (Gabarit passe-partout international, PPI) was agreed to in 1913 as a general minimum standard (individual lines can and do adhere to larger loading gauge standards) and came into force in 1914. As a result, British (passenger) trains have noticeably and considerably smaller loading gauges and smaller interiors, despite the track being standard gauge.

This results in increased costs for purchasing trains as they must be specifically designed for the British network, rather than being purchased "off-the-shelf". For example, the new trains for HS2 have a 50% premium applied to the "classic compatible" sets which will be able to run on the rest of the network, meaning they will cost £40 million each rather than £27 million for the captive stock (built to European standards and unable to run on other lines), despite the captive stock being larger. Similarly prior to the construction of High Speed 1 (then also known as the "Channel Tunnel Rail Link") to continental European standards, the first generation Eurostar trains were required to have several custom modifications compared to the TGV trains they are based on, including narrower loading gauge and provision for third rail electrification as used in southeast England. The successor Eurostar e320 is an almost "off the shelf" Siemens Velaro and is thus incompatible with most of the British legacy rail network but can run on most of Europe's high speed rail network.

Railway platform height

The European Union Commission issued a TSI (Technical Specifications for Interoperability) that sets out standard platform heights for passenger steps on high-speed rail. As the map indicates, there are several areas where 550 mm and 760 mm platform heights overlap and many trains serve stations with platforms of both heights posing challenges for step-free access. Where trains optimized for 760 mm platforms have to serve 550 mm platforms (or vice versa) accessibility is often limited. Due to path dependency a mixture of platform heights will continue to exist for the foreseeable future.

Cross-border operation 

The main international trains operating in Europe are:

Enterprise (Republic of Ireland & Northern Ireland (UK))
 Eurostar (United Kingdom, France, Belgium, Netherlands)
 EuroCity/EuroNight (conventional trains operated by nearly all Western and Central European operators, with the notable exception of the UK and Ireland)
 Frecciarossa (Italy, France)
Intercity Direct (Netherlands, Belgium)
InterCityExpress (Germany, Netherlands, Belgium, France, Denmark, Switzerland, Austria)
 TGV (France, Belgium, Italy, Switzerland, Spain, Germany, Luxembourg)
Thalys (France, Germany, Belgium, Netherlands)
 Railjet (Austria, Germany, Switzerland, Hungary, Czechia, Italy, Slovakia)
 Elipsos (France, Spain)
 Trenhotel (France, Spain, Portugal)
 Oresundtrain (Denmark, Sweden)
 SJ 2000 (Sweden, Norway, Denmark)
 NSB (Sweden, Norway)
 Allegro (Finland, Russia)
Belgrade-Bar Railway (Serbia, Montenegro)
Additionally, there are a lot of cross-border trains at the local level. Some local lines, like the Gronau to Enschede line between Germany and the Netherlands, operate on the signaling system of the country the line originates from, with no connection to the other country's network, whilst other train services like the Saarbahn between Germany and France use specially equipped vehicles that have a certificate to run on both networks. When there is an electrification difference between two countries, border stations with switchable overhead lines can be used. Venlo railway station in the Netherlands is one such example, the overhead on the tracks can be switched between the Dutch 1500 V DC and the German 15 kV AC, which means a change of traction (or reconfiguring a multiple-voltage vehicle) is necessary at the station. On the other hand, an increasing number of locomotives can change voltages "on the fly" without stopping, usually with temporarily lowered pantographs, for instance on the viaduct of Moresnet where freight trains change voltages between Belgian 3 kV DC and German 15 kV 16.7 Hz. A third possibility concerns networks using voltages of the same order of magnitude, such as Belgium (3 kV DC) and the Netherlands (1.5 kV DC): Belgian trains to Maastricht or Roosendaal (Dutch stations located near the border) can use the lower Dutch voltage, albeit with reduced power, on the short stretch from the border to their Dutch terminal station and back. Increasingly the European Union mandates unified standards (see below) for newly built high speed lines to allow smoother international passenger services.

Subsidies

EU rail subsidies amounted to €73 billion in 2005. Subsidies vary widely from country to country in both size and how they are distributed, with some countries giving direct grants to the infrastructure provider and some giving subsidies to train operating companies, often through public service obligations. In general long-distance trains are not subsidized.

The 2017 European Railway Performance Index found a positive correlation between public cost and a given railway system's performance and differences in the value that countries receive in return for their public cost. The 2015 and 2017 performance reports found a strong relationship between cost efficiency and the share of subsidies allocated to infrastructure managers. A transparent subsidy structure, in which public subsidies are provided directly to the infrastructure manager rather than spread among multiple train-operating companies, correlates with a higher-performing railway system.

The 2017 Index found Denmark, Finland, France, Germany, the Netherlands, Sweden, and Switzerland capture relatively high value for their money, while Luxembourg, Belgium, Latvia, Slovakia, Portugal, Romania, and Bulgaria underperform relative to the average ratio of performance to cost among European countries.

Total railway subsidies by country

Liberalization

Fourth Railway Package attempts liberalization of domestic passenger services in an attempt to reduce European rail subsidies.

Harmonizing rules
 First Railway Package (EU Directive 91/440)
 Second Railway Package
 Third railway package
Fourth railway package
 European Rail Traffic Management System on harmonized signaling systems, to allow more cross-border trains
 Trans-European conventional rail network
 Single European Railway Area
As mentioned above, historically rules and standards on European railroads varied widely and thus the European Union has undertaken efforts to harmonize and standardize those towards a single common European set of rules. The advent of High Speed Rail added to the "classical" problems of railway electrification standards, gauge, loading gauge and "classical" signaling the additional problem of train protection systems which are necessary for any train exceeding the speed limit of legacy signaling (79 mph in the United States, 160 km/h in much of continental Europe and 125 mph in Great Britain). Virtually every European country with significant high speed rail ambitions developed its own, incompatible, standard, be it German LZB, French TVM or Italian BACC. As there was resistance to choosing any of the pre-existing systems as a basis for a new European standard the European Train Control System or ETCS was developed and is now mandatory for newly built high speed lines receiving EU funding.

See also 
 Eurail Pass
 High-speed rail in Europe
 Interrail Pass
 Trans Europ Express
 Channel Tunnel
 List of highest railways in Europe

External links 
 Council Directive 91/440/EEC of 29 July 1991 on the development of the Community's railways
 Council Directive 96/48/EC of 23 July 1996 on the interoperability of the trans-European high-speed rail system
 Maps of railway networks in Europe
 Level of service on passenger railway connections between European metropolises Report of the Transport and Spatial Planning Institute
 Eurail map
 Interrail map
 halotravel.com organization that advises and supplies Eurail or Interrail travelers with information, travel routes and passes.

References